is one of the thirteen Shinto sects.

History 
 was involved in diplomatic negotiations as a senior vassal of the Shogunate at the end of the Edo period, he turned to Shinto at the beginning of the Meiji restoration.

He became a shinto teacher in 1872, rallied for independence as a Shinto Sect in 1879, and gained it in 1882 During his tenure as president Mitake-kyo also gained independence

After World War II it became independent from the Sect Shinto federation alongside Tenrikyo

However in 1995 the president attended a Sect Shinto event the "100th Anniversary of the Formation of the Federation of Shinto Churches"

Shrines 
Shrines of Shinto Taiseikyo include

 Tenshozan Shrine : Yugawara Town, Ashigarashimo District, Kanagawa Prefecture.
 Tenshozan Shrine branch shrine
 Hirayama Seisai Tomb : Located in Yanaka Cemetery .

References 

Shinto new religious movements
Religious organizations based in Japan
Japanese new religions
13 Shinto Sects
Confucian Shinto